"Mint" is a song by Japanese singer-songwriter Rina Aiuchi. It was released on 15 August 2007 through Giza Studio, as the second single from her sixth studio album Trip. The single reached number nineteen in Japan and has sold over 8,995 copies nationwide. The song served as the theme songs to the Japanese television shows, Super Chanpurū and Mu-Gen ~Music Generations~.

Track listing

Charts

Certification and sales

|-
! scope="row"| Japan (RIAJ)
| 
| 8,995
|-
|}

Release history

References

2007 singles
2007 songs
J-pop songs
Song recordings produced by Daiko Nagato
Songs written by Rina Aiuchi